Breathing Is Irrelevant is the debut studio album by the Canadian mathcore band Ion Dissonance, released on September 2, 2003 through Willowtip Records.

The title of the track "The Death of One Man Is a Tragedy, the Death of 10,000 Is a Statistic" is a quotation commonly attributed to Joseph Stalin.

Track listing

Personnel
Ion Dissonance 
Gabriel McCaughry – vocals
Antoine Lussier – guitar
Sebastien Chaput – guitar
Jean-François Richard – drums
Miguel Valade – bass
Other staff
Yannick St-Amand – mastering

References

2003 debut albums
Ion Dissonance albums
Willowtip Records albums